Zaube is a village in Zaube Parish, Cēsis Municipality in the Vidzeme region of Latvia.

Notable people

 Thiess of Kaltenbrun, self-confessed werewolf and condemned heretic.

References

Towns and villages in Latvia
Cēsis Municipality
Vidzeme